State Trunk Highway 87 (often called Highway 87, STH-87 or WIS 87) is a state highway in Polk and Burnett counties in the US state of Wisconsin that runs north–south in the northwestern portion of the state from St. Croix Falls to Grantsburg. It was first designated as a state highway in 1924.

Route description

The highway begins at an intersection with US Highway 8 (US 8) in St. Croix Falls, just east of the St. Croix River. The highway runs north from the intersection, running along Washington Street in St. Croix. The highway then follows the St. Croix River until it curves to the west. Soon after, the highway swerves to the west and meets County Trunk Highway I (CTH-I), running north from it. It then passes through Eureka Center and a  concurrency with CTH-G before reaching Cushing, from where it runs  to the west before continuing north. The highway then passes by a few lakes and the community of Trade River, and then runs east of Fish Lake Wildlife Area. While running east of the wildlife area, it runs concurrently with WIS 48. After the wildlife area's boundary ends, the highway passes through Branstad before terminating with WIS 48 at WIS 70 in Grantsburg.

History
In 1923, the highway in its entirety was signed as County Trunk Highway F (CTH-F). The next year, it was signed as WIS 87 alongside WIS 48, which it runs concurrently with near Grantsburg. The highway was unpaved along its entire route and would stay that way until at least 1956.

Major intersections

See also

References

External links

087
Transportation in Polk County, Wisconsin
Transportation in Burnett County, Wisconsin